Wolfgang Thomale (25 February 1900 – 20 October 1978) was a German general during World War II.  He was a recipient of the Knight's Cross of the Iron Cross of Nazi Germany. He was a prisoner of war at Camp Ritchie in Maryland and was involved with the Hill Project, an effort to use German POWs to translate texts to better understand Military efforts of the Nazi regime following the end of the War.

Awards and decorations

 Knight's Cross of the Iron Cross on 10 February 1942 as Oberstleutnant and commander of Panzer-Regiment 27

References

Bibliography

 

1900 births
1978 deaths
Lieutenant generals of the German Army (Wehrmacht)
People from Leszno
People from the Province of Posen
German Army personnel of World War I
Prussian Army personnel
Recipients of the clasp to the Iron Cross, 2nd class
Recipients of the Gold German Cross
Recipients of the Knight's Cross of the Iron Cross
Commanders Crosses of the Order of Merit of the Federal Republic of Germany
German prisoners of war in World War II
Reichswehr personnel
German Army generals of World War II